Zeki Majed (born 13 November 1996) is a Kurdish filmmaker and poet. He was born and raised in Sofia, Bulgaria.

Biography

His first poem, Eyes Never Dry, won first prize at Pendle War Poetry Competition. He wrote multiple love poems, praising women. A poem he wrote, Brave Woman, was read at St Margaret's, Westminster by Glenys Kinnock, Baroness Kinnock of Holyhead in memory of British MP Jo Cox.

References

External links
Interview for NOVA tv
Radio Interview
PoemHunter

1996 births
Living people
Kurdish poets
21st-century Bulgarian poets
Bulgarian male poets
Nationality missing
Film people from Sofia
21st-century male writers